Thiotricha oleariae is a moth of the family Gelechiidae. It is endemic to in New Zealand, where it has been recorded from the central part of the North Island south down to Stewart Island. The species is found at altitudes of between sea-level up to 900 metres. The larvae live in a constructed case, are leaf miners and are active in November. The larval host species are within in the genus Olearia. Adults are nocturnal and on the wing from November to March.

Taxonomy 
This species was first described by George Hudson in his publication, The butterflies and moths of New Zealand, in 1928 using a specimen collected by Stella Hudson at Days Bay in Wellington. Stella Hudson collected a larval specimen feeding on Olearia solandri and George Hudson reared it to maturity. The male lectotype is held at Te Papa. The lectotype specimen is held at Te Papa.

Description

Larvae live in a constructed case.

Hudson described the larvae of this species as follows:

Hudson described the adult of the species as follows:

Distribution
This species has been observed from the central part of the North Island south to Stewart Island. It is found at altitudes from sea-level up to 900 metres.

Behaviour 

The larva of this species is active in November. It constructs a case approximately  inch in length. The posterior third of the case is strongly angled and is made up of three leaves. The angled portion of the case is the earlier formed portion, with the two subsequently formed parts of the case being more or less aligned. The adult of this species are nocturnal and are on the wing between November and March.

Hosts

The larvae feed on the foliage of Olearia species, including Olearia solandri from within their portable case. They mine and erode the leaves.

References

Moths described in 1928
Thiotricha
Moths of New Zealand
Endemic fauna of New Zealand
Taxa named by George Hudson
Endemic moths of New Zealand